Gustavo F. Velasquez is the Director of the California Department of Housing & Community Development. Between 2014 and 2017, Velasquez served as the Assistant Secretary of the Office of Fair Housing and Equal Opportunity in the U.S. Department of Housing and Urban Development.

Education 
Velasquez was born in Oaxaca, Mexico. He received degrees from the University of Pennsylvania; B.A. in Public Administration and Political science; Master’s Degree in Government Administration. He also completed the Executive Program on Strategic Planning and Business Transformation at the University of Pennsylvania’s Wharton School of Business.

Career 
He worked for Congreso de Latinos Unidos in Philadelphia, as well as was Director of District of Columbia Office of Latino Affairs (OLA) and the Office of Human Rights (OHR). He was Executive Director of the Latino Economic Development Center (LEDC) in the District of Columbia.

On January 16, 2014, President Obama nominated Velasquez for Assistant Secretary of the Office of Fair Housing and Equal Opportunity in the U.S. Department of Housing and Urban Development. His nomination was confirmed by the U.S. Senate on June 19, 2014. Velasquez served in this role until January 20, 2017. 

On April 2, 2020, California Governor Gavin Newsom appointed Velasquez the Director of the Department of Housing & Community Development.

References 

1972 births
Activists for Hispanic and Latino American civil rights
American people of Mexican descent
Living people
Obama administration personnel
United States Assistant Secretaries of Housing and Urban Development
University of Pennsylvania alumni